Daniel Archer (born 17 June 1939) is an Australian former cricketer. He played one first-class match for Tasmania in 1965/66.

See also
 List of Tasmanian representative cricketers

References

External links
 

1939 births
Living people
Australian cricketers
Tasmania cricketers
Cricketers from Launceston, Tasmania